Statistics of Portuguese Liga in the 1957/1958 season.

Overview

It was contested by 14 teams, and Sporting Clube de Portugal won the championship.

League standings

Results

References

Primeira Liga seasons
1
Portugal